Saint-Cyprien is a railway station of modest size and importance in the village of Saint-Cyprien, Dordogne, France. The station is located on the Siorac-en-Périgord - Cazoulès railway line. The station is served by TER (local) services operated by the SNCF.

Train services
The following services currently call at Saint-Cyprien:
local service (TER Nouvelle-Aquitaine) Bordeaux - Libourne - Bergerac - Sarlat-la-Canéda
local service (TER Nouvelle-Aquitaine) Périgueux - Sarlat-la-Canéda

References

Railway stations in Dordogne